Profile: Best of Emmylou Harris is a compilation of hits by Emmylou Harris from her first four Reprise/Warner albums: Pieces of the Sky, Elite Hotel, Luxury Liner and Quarter Moon in a Ten Cent Town. The album rose as high as #9 on the Billboard country albums chart in 1978.

Track listing

References

Emmylou Harris compilation albums
1978 compilation albums
Albums produced by Brian Ahern (producer)
Warner Records compilation albums